Detlef Siebert is a German  television writer, director and producer, working in the United Kingdom.

Biography
Siebert began his career at the BBC as assistant producer of the 1997 documentary series The Nazis: A Warning from History.

He wrote, directed and produced the 2001 Bombing Germany episode of the Timewatch series.

He also directed the drama sequences in the 2005 series Auschwitz: The Nazis and the 'Final Solution', wrote, directed and produced the 2006 drama documentary The Somme - From Defeat to Victory, and produced the 2006 series Nuremberg: Nazis on Trial, produced the 2011 docudrama Atlantis: End of a World, Birth of a Legend.

In his latest programme, the 2014 BBC Two documentary, I Was There: The Great War Interviews, Siebert used interviews with eyewitnesses of the First World War filmed by the BBC in the 1960s. Most of the interview material in the film had never been shown  and the film garnered critical acclaim.

Filmography
 1994 Dichter, Tod, und Teufel: Salman Rushdie co-producer/director
 1997 The Nazis: A Warning from History assistant producer
 1999 War of the Century assistant producer
 2001 Timewatch: Bombing Germany producer, director & writer
 2001 Timewatch: Himmler, Hitler, and the End of the Reich producer, director & writer
 2005 Auschwitz: The Nazis and the 'Final Solution' drama director
 2006 The Somme - From Defeat to Victory producer, director & writer
 2006 Nuremberg: Nazis on Trial series producer
 2007 Visions of the Future series producer
 2009 How the Celts Saved Britain executive producer
 2011 Atlantis: End of a World, Birth of a Legend producer
 2014 I Was There: The Great War Interviews
 2016 The Man Who Discovered Capitalism (about Joseph Schumpeter)

References

Year of birth missing (living people)
Living people